Chaiya Alee Mahapab (born 21 September 1976) is a Thai former football referee. He referees in the Thai Premier League, Chinese Super League and Chinese FA Cup.

He became a FIFA elite referee class in 2007. He refereed at 2010 AFF Suzuki Cup, 2014 FIFA World Cup qualifiers, and more international competitions.

In April 2016 Chaiya along with another official named Thanom Borikut were suspended by the AFC Disciplinary Committee for alleged match-fixing.

References

1976 births
Chaiya Mahapab
Living people
Chaiya Mahapab